Woodruff is a city in Spartanburg County, South Carolina, United States, located in upstate South Carolina. The population was 4,333 at the 2020 census.

Geography
Woodruff is located at  (34.740530, -82.032580).

History
The Earliest History of this area begins with the membership of “The Church of Christ on Jamey’s Creek” dated September 18, 1787. The church was so called as this was the nearest point of designation since “Jamey’s Creek” heads of McArthur Street behind the Woodruff State Branch Bank on North Main Street. The creek is now called “Jimmie’s Creek”. The early members traveled some distance to attend this church. They were from the communities of Cavins, Enoree, Crescent, Green Pond, Switzer and others in Laurens County. Most of the early settlers had come from Virginia and North Carolina. They were primarily veterans of the American Revolution and their families. Joseph Woodruff received a grant of 200 acres (which would later become Woodruff, S.C.). He came to this area from Yadkin River Valley in North Carolina after his service in the Revolution. The first census of Spartanburg District, in 1790, shows who his neighbors were. All of these people were farmers. There were a few country stores in those days, and these were supplied by “Wagoner’s”. One of Joseph Woodruff's sons, Thomas, remained in this area and had dreamed of founding a town. But, he did not live to see Woodruff incorporated. His two sons, Dr. Charles Pinckney Woodruff and Captain A. B. Woodruff were most instrumental in carrying out their father's wishes. Therefore, the town was named in Thomas Woodruff's honor. There was no town nor industry until after the town was chartered in 1874. Men from the rural areas came into Woodruff to establish businesses and the town began to grow. The two Woodruff brothers worked vigorously to get the railroad to run through the town.

The railroad was completed in 1885. This caused a rapid growth of business. The oldest standing home in Woodruff today is the home of Danny Verdin, located on Main Street. The house was built in the 1830s by Harrison Patillo Woodruff, son of Thomas. “Squire Jim” Westmoreland bought his home in 1874 when he came to Woodruff to establish a mercantile business. The home of Dr. Charles Pickney Woodruff stood where the Woodruff Post Office is now located. Capt. A. B. Woodruff's home was located on East Georgia Street. The site is now used as an overflow parking lot for the Lanford Funeral Home.[woodruff sc website] The Old Woodruff High School, First Presbyterian Church of Woodruff, and Hurricane Tavern are listed on the National Register of Historic Places.

Government and city departments
Kenneth Gist is the current mayor, the city manager is Lee Bailey. City Council members include Mattie Norman, Toni Sloan, William "Buddy" Arnold, James Smith, Scott Dickard and Sharon Kelly.

The town is also noted for being situated near an international aeromodelling center, Triple Tree Aerodrome, where the world's largest model airplane event happens annually, Joe Nall Week.

Other city departments include the fire department (The Woodruff Fire Department became a part of The Trinity Fire Department in July 2019, parks and recreation, building codes and zoning, police department, streets department, and sewer department.

Education
Spartanburg School District Four, is the district that serves Woodruff, and other nearby areas. With roughly 2800 students. The district superintendent is Dr. W. Rallie Liston. The district has one of the best high schools in the state.
SCSD4 has four schools.
Woodruff Primary School (3K-2nd Grades)
Woodruff Elementary School (3rd-5th Grades)
Woodruff Middle School (6th-8th Grades)
Woodruff High School (9th-12th Grades)

Throughout its history, Woodruff High has experienced a large amount of success in athletics, most notably football. Under the leadership of Coach W. L. Varner, Woodruff High athletics has numerous state titles.

Woodruff is also home to the Project Fun Homeschool Co-op which serves students in Spartanburg, Greenville, Laurens and Union counties.

Woodruff has a lending library, a branch of the Spartanburg County Public Library.

Media
Woodruff has a radio station that is Woodruff specific; WQUL is a radio station located in Woodruff that plays oldies, carries local sports games, and keeps the community abreast of local events. It can be found at 95.9 FM.

Demographics

2020 census

As of the 2020 United States census, there were 4,212 people, 1,577 households, and 891 families residing in the city.

2000 census
As of the census of 2000, there were 4,229 people, 1,678 households, and 1,130 families residing in the city. The population density was 1,154.8 people per square mile (446.1/km2). There were 1,869 housing units at an average density of 510.4 per square mile (197.2/km2). The racial makeup of the city was 68.53% White, 27.71% African American, 0.17% Native American, 0.14% Asian, 0.02% Pacific Islander, 1.63% from other races, and 1.80% from two or more races. Hispanic or Latino of any race were 3.74% of the population.
With a population 4,229 there are three Authur state banks within a mile of each 3 homeless shelters yet statistically no Woodruff residents are homeless. There are 4 mortuaries in the city of 4,229.
There were 1,678 households, out of which 30.6% had children under the age of 18 living with them, 42.8% were married couples living together, 19.0% had a female householder with no husband present, and 32.6% were non-families. 29.6% of all households were made up of individuals, and 14.8% had someone living alone who was 65 years of age or older. The average household size was 2.44 and the average family size was 3.00.

In the city, the population was spread out, with 25.2% under the age of 18, 8.7% from 18 to 24, 26.5% from 25 to 44, 22.3% from 45 to 64, and 17.3% who were 65 years of age or older. The median age was 37 years. For every 100 females, there were 83.6 males. For every 100 females age 18 and over, there were 79.1 males.

The median income for a household in the city was $24,824, and the median income for a family was $32,966. Males had a median income of $26,204 versus $21,467 for females. The per capita income for the city was $14,535. About 15.5% of families and 18.4% of the population were below the poverty line, including 19.3% of those under age 18 and 19.3% of those age 65 or over.

Notable people
Ken "The Hawk" Harrelson, Former Major league baseball player, current T.V. broadcaster for the Chicago White Sox
 Sammy Taylor, major league baseball player from 1958 to 1963 with the Chicago Cubs, New York Mets, Cleveland Indians and Cincinnati Reds.
 Tony Rice (American football), quarterback for University of Notre Dame (1986-1988, 1988 NCAA Football National Champions), Canadian Football League and World League of American Football.
Wilson Casey, Trivia Guinness World Record holder, professional entertainer/speaker, nationally syndicated newspaper columnist in 500+ newspapers, most-read writer from the Carolinas with 50 versions of published books, works, and calendars.
Willie Varner (1926-2009), National High School Sports Hall of Fame

References

External links
 City of Woodruff official website

Cities in South Carolina
Cities in Spartanburg County, South Carolina
Populated places established in 1787